Sejita is an unincorporated community in southern Duval County, Texas, United States.

The Ramirez Common School District serves area students in grades pre-kindergarten through six. Students in grades seven through twelve attend Benavides Secondary School in nearby Benavides.

References

Unincorporated communities in Texas
Unincorporated communities in Duval County, Texas